The International Ballet Festival of Havana (Festival de Ballet de La Habana) is a biennial ballet festival held in the Great Theater of Havana, Cuba and other locations like Karl Marx Theatre and Mella Theatre. Created in 1960 by a joint effort of the Ballet Nacional de Cuba, the Instituto Nacional de la Industria Turística (National Institution of the Tourist Industry) and the cultural organizations of the government, the International Ballet Festival of Havana was part of an artistic movement following the Cuban Revolution. 

Held every two years, the Festival features over 20 performances and a few world premieres. It is one of the oldest ballet festivals in the world. Upon its creation in 1960, it quickly became one of the most transcendental events of the national Cuban culture.

Festivals

1st through 6th festivals
The years that followed the first three festivals, 1960, 1966 and 1967, were a long work period recorded as one of the most beautiful pages in the history of the Ballet Nacional de Cuba since its casting was enriched with the first graduates from the Escuela Nacional de Ballet (National Ballet School), its consolidation as one of the dance companies of greatest international prestige and the heroic battles fought against the unfair barrier that didn’t allow its worldwide recognition. The 4th festival was held in 1974 and was dedicated to the 2nd Congress of the Federation of Cuban Women and from that year on the festival was celebrated every two years and has emphasized this particular aspect that has characterized its work. The 5th festival was dedicated to the 30th Anniversary of the Granma landing. The 6th festival was dedicated to the 30th anniversary of the Foundation of the National Ballet of Cuba and to the 35th anniversary of Alicia Alonso’s debut in the role of Giselle. This festival also made an emphasis on “the premiere of works created for the company by well-known international choreographers, Cuban and foreign”.

7th & 8th festivals
The 7th festival was dedicated to highlight the relationship of ballet with the rest of the arts and in it together with the Premiere Nights, Repertoire Nights with the usual works of the BNC and the Concerts of International Stars, there were galas dedicated to the dramatic theater, the plastic arts, the music, the cinema, the folklore and the literature as well as special galas dedicated to the birthday of the great Russian choreographer Mikhail Fokin and to the ballet Giselle on occasion of the performance of the couple made up by the Prima Ballerina Assoluta Alicia Alonso and the famous Russian dancer Vladimir Vasiliev. The 8th festival gave special attention to The presence of Latin America in its choreographic creation allowed knowing roots, experiences, ways and achievements of the dance in the continent. A transcendental event was the beginning, parallel to the festival, of the First International Practical Course of the Cuban School of Ballet, that was attended by dancers, advanced students and observers from eleven American and European countries as well as a big Cuban representation that created a tradition that stands up to now.

9th festival and 10th
The 9th festival put an emphasis on the styles and the choreographers. This made it possible to see a panoramic of the principal choreographic landmarks that ballet has known throughout its history. The 10th celebration was an opportunity for the festival to be a great party of art and friendship with the presence of hundreds of guests, among them famous stars and dance companies coming from all over the world, who, together with the members of the National Ballet of Cuba and other groups, carried out a varied program.

11th through 14th
The 11th festival was dedicated to two important anniversaries: the 150th anniversary of the Gran Teatro de La Habana, the oldest theatrical institution of the country and the 40th anniversary of the foundation of the Ballet Nacional de Cuba. The 12th had a slogan: Past, present and choreographic future and showed a rich sample of styles and tendencies present in the dance of our times. 13th festival emphasized in The Iberian American presence in the art of ballet while it commemorated the 5th Centennial of the Encounter of the American and European Cultures and faithful to this credo participated in the festival important companies, stars and personalities of the dance in Spain and Iberian America that offered a rich sample arisen from the talent and common zeal of these cultural aspects. The 14th festival pointed out the diversity and richness of the choreographic art with an attractive offer of styles and tendencies within the academic, contemporary and folkloric dance and where galas dedicated to Romanticism and Classicism excelled as well as concert programs with Cuban and foreign artists and the performances of nearly a dozen guest companies.

15th festival
The 15th festival emphasized on the composers or musical styles that had the greatest influence in dance. There were galas dedicated to Cuban and French composers, to baroque composers, to Frédéric Chopin, Igor Stravinski and Manuel de Falla- to commemorate the 120th anniversary of his birthday and the 50th of his death-, and as well to the Russian composer Pyotr Ilyich Tchaikovsky, key figure in the classic ballet.

16th festival
The 16th festival was dedicated to a transcendental anniversary: the 50th Anniversary of the foundation of the Ballet Nacional de Cuba. Hundreds of guests were present on this occasion among them companies such as Julio Bocca’s from Argentina, the Ballet of Zaragoza, the Spanish Ballet of Murcia (Spain), the Soloist Group from the Komische Opera of Berlin and the Great Dessau Theater (Germany) the Diastases Group (Cyprus), the Company dance Theater of  Turin (Italy); Introdans Ensemble Voor der Jeugd (Netherlands) as well as  Kennedy's Tap Dance Company and The Alvin Ailey Repertory Ensemble, both from the United States. The guest list was made up by the famous Italian ballerina Carla Fracci, who came to give prestige to this event after 24 years of her first visit in 1974, as well as stars belonging to well-known companies such as the Paris Opera Ballet, the Ballet of the Teatro alla Scala from Milan, the American Ballet Theatre, the New York City Ballet, the Bolshoi Ballet of Moscow, the Ballet Estable of the Colon Theater from Argentina, the Royal Danish Ballet, the Ballet of the Opera of Berlin, the National Hungarian Ballet, the Classical Ballet of Guangzhou, China, the Ballet of the Municipal Theater of Rio de Janeiro, and the National Dance Company of Mexico, among others. Collateral activities such as the presentation of the book Ballet Nacional de Cuba: Half a Century of Glory, written by the historian Miguel Cabrera, a stamp cancellation, photographic and plastic arts and movie and video exhibitions were part of the festival. Two important moments in this festival were the inauguration of the Dance Museum and the celebration of the 1st Iberian American Choreographic Competition organized by the General Society of Authors and Editors (SGAE), the Author's Foundation and the Ballet Nacional de Cuba.

17th & 18th festival
The 17th festival was dedicated to highlight the principal creators and choreographic tendencies that have enriched ballet in the 20th century and in it were present besides the Cubans, six foreign companies among them the Ballet of Washington, the folkloric Ballet of Puebla, The Da Capo company and the Dance Group (Azahar) from Valencia, Spain. There were also other representatives from seventeen countries of America, Asia and Australia. The 18th festival was inaugurated by Fidel Castro, President of the State and Ministers Council of Cuba and the festival slogan was Past, present and future of the dance.  Four foreign companies among them the Dessau Ballet from Germany, and the choreographic Center of Valencia, Spain were present as well as seven Cuban companies and dancers, choreographers and special guests coming from fifteen countries of America, Europe and Asia. During the event it was announced the winning work of the 3rd Iberian American Choreographic Competition that corresponded to the Cuban George Enrique Céspedes’ work Por favor, no me limites..., and a wide repertoire that performed in galas and concerts showed the representative works of the most valuable romantic-classical inheritance of the 19th century, as well as contemporary creations of Cuban and foreign choreographers. A wide group of collateral activities that included plastic arts, photographic and movie exhibitions and conferences, enriched the festival.

Beyond
After more than four decades of work, the International Ballet Festival of Havana goes forward keeping its creative potentiality in the promissory future of the 21st century.

Throughout its more than four decades of productive existence, possible thanks to the agglutinative gift of Alicia Alonso and the unmovable support of the cultural organizations of the Cuban state, the International Ballet Festival of Havana has wished and known how to be a meeting of the best of art endowed with a typical feature that at the same time that singles it out, contributes to strengthen its well-earned prestige. Enough to say that in these forty-two years of existence, fifty-eight foreign companies have been present and about a thousand guests (dancers, choreographers, pedagogues, designers, soloists, composers, critics and observers) coming from fifty-two countries of the five continents. The known encouragement offered to the creation not only of Cuban choreographers but foreign ones as well representatives of the most valuable and different tendencies of the contemporary art of the dance, has made possible the premiere of 777 works, 198 of them were world premieres and 579 were premieres in Cuba. Its multiple collateral activities (photographic and plastic arts, cinema exhibitions, philatelic and poster editions as well as editions of specialized books, among others).

Participated countries in the Ballet Festivals
Europe (26)
Austria, Belgium, Bulgaria, Cyprus, Czechoslovakia, Denmark, Spain, Russian Federation, Finland, France, United Kingdom, Greece, Netherlands, Hungary, Italy, Latvia, Norway, Poland, Portugal, West Germany, East Germany, Romania, Sweden, Switzerland, Soviet Union and Yugoslavia.

Asia (6)
Philippines, Japan, Vietnam, China, Israel and Kazakhstan

Africa (4)
Angola, Algeria, Egypt, Guinea.

North America (10)
Canada, Costa Rica, Dominican Republic, Guatemala, Martinique, Mexico, Nicaragua, Panama, Puerto Rico, and United States.

Oceania (1)
Australia.

South America (9)
Argentina, Brazil, Colombia, Chile, Ecuador, French Guiana, Peru, Uruguay, Venezuela.

Total: 56 countries

Choreographic Premieres
World premieres: 198

Premieres in Cuba: 579

Total:  777 premieres

See also

 Aspendos International Opera and Ballet Festival
 Canadian Ballet Festival
 USA International Ballet Competition

References

External links
International Ballet of Havana at the National Ballet of Cuba homepage

Culture in Havana
Ballet in Cuba
Ballet competitions